M.G. Srinivas  is an Indian actor, film director and screenwriter who works in Kannada cinema. He made his debut as a director in the Kannada films with Topiwala (2013), a commercial entertainer starring Upendra.

Srinivas's first rendezvous with the entertainment industry was as an RJ. His show on 93.5 RED FM, Blade Raja made him famous. His short films had also generated an equal amount of buzz in the media circles. While Rules, his first short film, has the distinction of being screened at Australia's Bollywood and Beyond Film Festival, his next project won him the prestigious Platinum Remi Award at the Houston Film Festival. Titled Simply Kailawesome, the film centers itself around the life and literary works of renowned Kannada writer T P Kailasam. It was also this very film that caught Upendra's attention, following which Topiwala happened. This led to his first feature Topiwala, with Upendra in the lead.

Early life and background 
He was educated at Bangalore's Presidency School. After completing his graduation and acquiring his BSc degree from Seshadripuram College he commenced his career as a dance choreographer. Later in 2007, he joined Red FM as a professional radio jockey.

Personal life
He married Shruti IL, Journalist on 30 June 2019 in Mysore.

Film career 
Alongside his radio jockey career, Srini started making short films. His first short movie was Rules, which grabbed attention for its slapstick comedy inter-twined with a satirical tone on speed breakers. This film was officially screened in the Australian Film Festival, Bollywood, and Beyond.

Following this stint, Srini, trained at Abhinaya Taranga to learn the nuances of acting. He made his second short film Simply Kailawesome, which was based on TP Kailasam’s works. He essayed the lead role in the film. Simply Kailawesome’s win of the Platinum Remi Award at the Houston Film Festival, paved way for a formal introduction to Kannada superstar Upendra. MGS then went on to direct Topiwala for Upendra and the film opened to a positive response. 

Srini next directed a romantic comedy, Srinivasa Kalyana, produced by Bharat Jain under Mars Films. This movie also saw Srini making his commercial movie debut as a lead actor. However, Srini was first seen as an actor in Sudeep directorial, Just Maath Maathalli.In this 2010 Kannada movie, he was seen as Ramya's music freak brother.

Srinivasa Kalyana opened to positive reviews across the state. Deccan Chronicle gave the movie 3/5 and praised the movie for its light-hearted comedy and youthful charm which showed a complex philosophical thought in a simple manner. Times of India rated 3.5/5 and praised the sass touch to this candy-floss romance. 

Srini's next venture was the crime thriller Birbal Trilogy. The first part is, Case 1: Finding Vajramuni, followed by Case No.2: Avrn bitt, Ivrn bitt, Ivryaru? and the last one is Case No.3 : Turremane. Birbal Trilogy Case 1: Finding Vajramuni, released in January 2019, and starred MGS himself and Rukmini Vasanth in the lead. Sujay Shastry, Suresh Heblikar, and Madhusudhan Rao are also, seen in prominent roles. 

Srini completed the film Old MonkThe film features MG Srinivas, Aditi Prabhudeva in lead role. The film's title was inspired from the popular alcohol beverage brand, but it also means "Hale Sanyasi" in Kannada. Veteran actor Rajesh, made a special cameo appearance in the film. The film was released on February 25, 2022 simultaneously in the Kannada and Telugu languages.
Critics praised the direction, comedy, writing, dialogue and performance of the film. Music Director duo Saurabh and Vaibhav collaborate a second time with Srini after Birbal, and are one of the producers of the movie.

Srini is currently working on his next film Ghost The team has already completed its first two schedules recently in which they filmed some crucial scenes of the movie in a huge prison interior set in Mysore and Bengaluru.Ghost is an upcoming Indian Kannada-language action thriller written and directed by M. G. Srinivas, and produced by Sandesh Nagraj under Sandesh Productions banners. The film stars Shiva Rajkumar, with  Vijay Sethupathi, Prashant Narayanan, Jayaram,Anupam Kher and Archana Jois in supporting roles. The film was officially announced in 2022 under the Sandesh Nagraj Productions Sandalwood. It is an action heist thriller, the shoot for the film is presently underway. and all set to release in third quarter of 2023.

Awards 
 Nominated at Bollywood & Beyond film festival in Australia for work Rules
 Srini had won Platinum Remi Award at the Houston Film Festival for the short movie Simply Kailawesome.
 Srini won RISING STAR Award at the Chittara Star Awards in 2022

Filmography

References

External links 

 MG Srinivas on IMDb
 MG Srinivas on Twitter
 MG Srinivas on BookMyShow
 MG Srinivas on Facebook
 Collected news and commentary on Times Of India.

Kannada film directors
Living people
1984 births